Yushan or Yu Shan may refer to:

Places
 Yu Shan, highest point in Taiwan
 Yushan Range, a mountain range in Taiwan
 Yushan National Park, Taiwan
 Yushan County, Jiangxi
 Yushan District, Ma'anshan, Anhui
 Yushan, Changshu, Jiangsu
 Yushan Island, Xiangshan, Zhejiang

Towns
 Yushan, Fuding (zh), in Fuding, Fujian
 Yushan, Hubei (zh), in Xiangzhou District, Xiangyang, Hubei
 Yushan, Hunan, in Huarong County
 Yushan, Dong'e County (zh), in Dong'e County, Shandong
 Yushan, Jinxiang County (zh), in Jinxiang County, Shandong

Written as "":
 Yushan, Jian'ou (zh), subdivision of Jian'ou, Fujian
 Yushan, Guizhou (zh), subdivision of Weng'an County, Guizhou
 Yushan, Henan (zh), subdivision of Suiping County, Henan
 Yushan, Kunshan (zh), subdivision of Kunshan, Jiangsu
 Yushan, Shaanxi (zh), subdivision of Lantian County, Shaanxi
 Yushan, Linshu County (zh), subdivision of Linshu County, Shandong
 Yushan, Sichuan (zh), in Bazhou District, Bazhong, Sichuan
 Yushan, Pan'an County (zh), subdivision of Pan'an County, Zhejiang

Other
 Jade Mountain in Chinese mythology
 Yushan-class landing platform dock, named after the mountain in Taiwan

See also
 Jade (disambiguation)